Juan Manuel Cueto (born 8 March 1963) is a Dominican Republic weightlifter. He competed in the men's featherweight event at the 1992 Summer Olympics.

References

1963 births
Living people
Dominican Republic male weightlifters
Olympic weightlifters of the Dominican Republic
Weightlifters at the 1992 Summer Olympics
Central American and Caribbean Games medalists in weightlifting
Place of birth missing (living people)
20th-century Dominican Republic people